Endangerment is a type of crime.

Endangerment may also refer to:

 Language endangerment, the risk that a language will fall out of use
 Species endangerment, the risk that a population of organisms will become extinct

See also

 Endangered (disambiguation)
 Jeopardy (disambiguation)